Bakhuta is a highland village in Georgia's Russian-occupied territory  of South Ossetia/Tskhinvali Region. It is located on the left bank of the river Patsa, to the south from Java Range, on the western slopes of Raro Mountain in the Java Municipality, Shida Kartli region. Distance to the municipal center Java is 20 km. The village is surrounded by Fir, Spruce-beech and Fir-beech mixed forests.

References 

Mskhlebi Community villages